Salmanak may refer to:
 Salmanak-e Olya
 Salmanak-e Sofla